Windische Höhe Pass (elevation 1110 m, 3,642 ft) is a high mountain pass in the Austrian Alps, located in the state of Carinthia (Kärnten). The pass connects St. Stefan in the Gail River valley with Feistritz an der Drau in the Drau River valley.

See also
 List of highest paved roads in Europe
 List of mountain passes

Mountain passes of the Alps
Mountain passes of Carinthia (state)
Gailtal Alps